William Pitt Amherst, 1st Earl Amherst, GCH, PC (14 January 177313 March 1857) was a British diplomat and colonial administrator. He was Governor-General of India between 1823 and 1828.

Background and education
Born at Bath, Somerset, Amherst was the son of William Amherst and Elizabeth, daughter of Thomas Paterson. He was the grand-nephew of Jeffrey Amherst, 1st Baron Amherst, and succeeded to his title in 1797 according to a special remainder in the letters patent. He was educated at Westminster School and Christ Church, Oxford.

Ambassador extraordinary to China

In 1816 he was sent as ambassador extraordinary to the court of China's Qing dynasty, with a view of establishing more satisfactory commercial relations between China and Great Britain. On arriving at Pei Ho (Baihe, today's Haihe), he was given to understand that he could only be admitted to the Jiaqing Emperor's presence on condition of performing the kowtow. To this, Amherst, following the advice of Sir George Thomas Staunton, who accompanied him as second commissioner, refused to consent, as Macartney had done in 1793, unless the admission was made that his sovereign was entitled to the same show of reverence from a mandarin of his rank. In consequence of this, he was refused entry into Peking (Beijing), and the object of his mission was frustrated.

His ship, the Alceste, after a cruise along the coast of Korea and to the Ryukyu Islands on proceeding homewards, was totally wrecked on a submerged rock in Gaspar Strait. Amherst and part of his shipwrecked companions escaped in the ship's boats to Batavia, whence relief was sent to the rest. The ship in which he returned to England in 1817 touched at St Helena and, as a consequence, he had several interviews with the emperor Napoleon (see Ellis's Proceedings of the Late Embassy to China, 1817; McLeod's Narrative of a Voyage in H.M.S. Alceste, 1817). There is undocumented speculation that in one of the interviews, Napoleon said, "China is a sleeping giant. Let her sleep. For when she wakes, she will shake the world."

Governor-General in India
Amherst was Governor-General of India from August 1823 to February 1828. The principal events of his government were annexation of Assam leading to the first Burmese war of 1824, resulting in the cession of Arakan and Tenasserim to the British Empire.

Amherst's appointment came on the heels of the removal of Governor-General Lord Hastings in 1823. Hastings had clashed with London over the issue of lowering the field pay of officers in the Bengal Army, a measure that he was able to avoid through successive wars against Nepal and the Marathan Confederacy. However, his refusal in the early 1820s during peacetime to lower field pay,  resulted in the appointment of Amherst, who was expected to carry out the demands from London.

However, Amherst was an inexperienced governor who was, at least in the early days of his tenure in Calcutta, influenced heavily by senior military officers in Bengal such as Sir Edward Paget. He inherited a territorial dispute from John Adam, the  acting Governor-General prior to his arrival, which involved  the Anglo-Burmese border on the Naaf River and this spilled over into violence on 24 September 1823. Unwilling to lose face in a time of Burmese territorial aggression, Amherst ordered the troops in.

The war was to last two years, with a price tag of 13 million pounds, contributing to an economic crisis in India. It was only due to the efforts of powerful friends such as George Canning and the Duke of Wellington that  Amherst was not recalled in disgrace at the end of the war.

The war significantly changed Amherst's stance on Burma, and he now adamantly refused to annexe Lower Burma, but he did not succeed in repairing his reputation entirely, and he was replaced in 1828. He was created Earl Amherst, of Arracan in the East Indies, and Viscount Holmesdale, in the County of Kent, in 1826. On his return to England he lived in retirement till his death in March 1857.

Family
Lord Amherst married twice, and remarkably, both his wives were dowager countesses of Plymouth. His first wife was Sarah, Dowager Countess of Plymouth (1762–1838), daughter of Andrew Archer, 2nd Baron Archer and widow of Other Windsor, 5th Earl of Plymouth (died 1799). She was more than ten years older than him, and the mother of several children. They were married in 1800 and were blessed with two sons as well as a daughter Lady Sarah Elizabeth Pitt Amherst. Sarah died in May 1838, aged 76, after about 38 years of marriage. Lady Amherst's pheasant was named after Sarah; it was at her instigation that the species was introduced from Asia to Bedfordshire. The genus Amherstia, a Burmese flowering tree, is also named after her.

In 1839, a year after the death of his first wife, Lord Amherst, aged 66, married the widowed daughter-in-law of his first wife. This was Mary, Dowager Countess of Plymouth (1792–1864), elder daughter and co-heiress of John Sackville, 3rd Duke of Dorset, and widow of his stepson Other Windsor, 6th Earl of Plymouth (1789–1833). Although this was an unusual marriage, it was not forbidden by either Church law or civil law. His second wife had no children, from either of her marriages.

Lord Amherst died in March 1857, aged 84 at Knole House in Kent, the seat of the Dukes of Dorset, a property which his second wife had inherited. He was survived by his second wife, Lady Amherst, heiress of Knole, who died in July 1864, aged 71. Lord Amherst was succeeded in his titles by his second and only surviving son, William.

See also
 Barrackpore mutiny of 1824

Notes

References

A. Thackeray and R. Evans, Amherst (Rulers of India series), 1894.

 Webster, Anthony. (1998) Gentlemen Capitalists: British Imperialism in Southeast Asia, Tauris Academic Studies, New York, .

External links

William Pitt and Sarah Archer Amherst Family Collection at the Amherst College Archives & Special Collections

1773 births
1857 deaths
Alumni of Christ Church, Oxford
Ambassadors of the United Kingdom to China
British people of the First Anglo-Burmese War
Diplomatic peers
Earls Amherst
Governors-General of India
People educated at Westminster School, London
People from Sevenoaks
People from Bath, Somerset
Peers of the United Kingdom created by George IV